Kuschel is a surname. Notable people with the surname include:

 (1918–2017), Chile-born entomologist deceased in New Zealand
Maximilian Kuschel (1851–1909), German ornithologist and oologist

German-language surnames